The John F. Kennedy Institute for North American Studies (JFKI) is a central institute at Freie Universität Berlin. The JFKI was founded in 1963 by Ernst Fraenkel, a political scientist and was named in the honor of John F. Kennedy after his assassination.

The JFKI seeks to explore North America in all its dimensions. Focusing on the United States and Canada, research and teaching at the JFKI unite culture and history with literature and political science, sociology and economics.

Along with the Institute for East European Studies and the Institute for Latin American Studies, John F. Kennedy Institute for North American Studies is one of the three interdisciplinary research institutes within the Free University of Berlin.

Graduate School of North American Studies 

The Graduate School of North American Studies at the JFKI was awarded with funding during the German excellence initiative for its Ph.D. program themed "The Challenges of Freedom". It was one of only two graduate schools in the humanities among 18 graduate schools in total which received this honor in October 2007.

JFKI library 

The JFKI library holds Germany's largest collection of scholarly literature and audiovisual material on North America. It receives funding from both the Canadian and the United States' government in order to acquire special collections in the research area of American Studies.

References

External links 
 John F. Kennedy Institute for North American Studies
 Graduate School of North American Studies
 JFKI Library

 

American studies
American culture
Historiography of the United States
Cultural studies organizations
Organizations established in 1963
Free University of Berlin
1963 establishments in Germany